Luigi Emilio Rodolfo Bertetti Bianco, better known as Gino Bianco (July 22, 1916 – May 8, 1984) was a racing driver from Brazil. Born in Milan, Italy, he emigrated to Brazil as a child and started racing there. He raced a Maserati A6GCM for the Escuderia Bandeirantes team and took part in four Formula One World Championship Grands Prix, with a best result of 18th at the 1952 British Grand Prix. Bianco later raced in hillclimbs and died in Rio de Janeiro, aged 67, after suffering from breathing problems.

Complete Formula One World Championship results
(key)

References 

1916 births
1984 deaths
Brazilian racing drivers
Brazilian Formula One drivers
Italian emigrants to Brazil